The Society of Women Artists (SWA) is a British art body dedicated to celebrating and promoting fine art created by women. It was founded as the Society of Female Artists (SFA) in 1856-7, offering women artists the opportunity to exhibit and sell their works. Annual exhibitions have been held in London since 1857, with some wartime interruptions.

History 
Particularly during the 19th century, the British art world was dominated by the Royal Academy (RA), founded in 1768. Two of the 34 named founders were women painters: Angelica Kauffman (1741–1807) and Mary Moser (1744–1819). However, it was not until 1922 that other female artists were admitted to the academy. Annie Swynnerton, a member of the Society of Women Artists since 1889, was elected as the first female associate member of the Royal Academy and in 1936, Dame Laura Knight became the first female elected full member of the Royal Academy.

A woman's place in society was perceived as passive and governed by emotion. And in the 1850s, the idea that women could be artists was hotly debated by John Ruskin and other critics in various journals. Ruskin wrote to Sophia Sinnett in 1858 "You must resolve to be quite a great paintress; the feminine termination does not exist, there never having been such a being as yet as a lady who could paint." Women were not considered as serious contributors to the field of art and had great difficulty in obtaining a public showing. Their education in the arts was limited and they had been excluded from the practice of drawing from the nude figure since the Royal Academy was founded. However, Ruskin later revised his opinion of women artists after seeing Elizabeth Thompson's The Roll Call at the Royal Academy in 1874. After much debate and petitioning, in December 1883, the Royal Academy Schools agreed to provide life classes "for the study of the partially draped figure" to female students but it was a further 10 years before women were admitted to these classes. It was at this time that life classes for women were becoming more widely available across the country.

Nevertheless, British women artists proved themselves capable of working both individually and in collaboration and consequently, gained greater credibility. In order to progress and find opportunities to exhibit, they began to form their own organisations. One of the most significant of those bodies was the Society of Female Artists, founded around 1857. Initially, membership was granted to women who had exhibited with the Society and who earned their livelihood through art.

Society of Female Artists (c. 1857 – c. 1869)

In 1857, English biographer Harriet Grote (1792–1878), together with a number of female artists and philanthropists, founded the Society of Female Artists.  The society was initially managed by a committee, and, although its members were sometimes listed in early catalogues, no presiding officer was ever named. The first published committee (1859) was composed of Harriet Grote; Mrs Edward Romilly; Mrs Stephenson; watercolour artist Elizabeth Murray; opera singer Jenny Lind, who was a friend of Harriet Grote; the novelist Lady Harriet Jane Trelawny; Miss Sotheby; and Catherine Stanley (nee Leycester), the mother of Arthur Penrhyn Stanley. Leonie Caron (later Mrs Alfred Buss) was the Society's first Secretary in 1857, succeeded by Mrs Elizabeth Dundas Murray, who served as Secretary from 1858-1865. Contemporary press reports also place Mrs David Laing (nee Mary Elizabeth West) among the founders. Early members included Mary Thornycroft, Margaret Tekusch and Augusta Innes Withers. 

The society's first exhibition, held at 315 Oxford Street, London between 1 June and 18 July 1857, became the focus of debate with regard to the role of women in art. The exhibition comprised 358 works by 149 female artists, the predominant genre being landscapes. In May 1857, prior to the opening, The Art Journal and The Spectator were supportive of the exhibition. After the exhibition closed, The Art Journal reported that "The Committee express their gratification in announcing that the success of their first exhibition has fully equalled their expectations." The Society then held annual exhibitions in London showing work of women artists (except in the years 1912–1914, 1919 and 1940–1946).

Until 1863, the annual exhibition received controversial reviews, probably as exhibits were chosen on a liberal and amicable basis. This was addressed in 1869, when their lack of professionalism led to a reorganisation of the Society under the patronage of the Duchess of Cambridge and consequently it was renamed the Society of Lady Artists. The Society has received royal patronage since 1865 (the current patron is Princess Michael of Kent).

In 1867 Mrs. Madeline Marrable, a prolific watercolourist and oil painter, joined the committee.

Society of Lady Artists (c 1869 – 1899) 
The Society's earliest records were lost or destroyed during World War II at the Society's headquarters at 195 Piccadilly, London (the Society's catalogues and remaining papers dating from 1929 are now housed in the Victoria and Albert Museum Library). As a result, there is some debate as to exactly when the Society was renamed from the SFA to the SLA. Secondary sources of reference suggest 1869, whereas other sources suggest it was 1873.

In 1886, Marrable became the first president of the society. In 1899, the mid-Victorian persona was discarded and the 20th century was embraced by the society with a new name, the Society of Women Artists (SWA).

Society of Women Artists (1899–present) 

The society has had many notable artists among its members. Dame Laura Knight, the first woman Royal Academician, was elected president in 1932 and retained that office until she retired in 1968 to become a Patron. Illustrator Mabel Lucie Atwell and Suzanne Lucas, past President of the Society of Botanical Artists and the first woman president of Royal Miniature Society (now known as Royal Society of Miniature Painters, Sculptors and Gravers), were also members. Current members include Daphne Todd, the first female president of the Royal Society of Portrait Painters from 1994 to 2000 and winner of the BP Portrait Award 2010, portraitist June Mendoza, and Philomena Davidson, first woman president of the Royal British Society of Sculptors.
 
Many SWA members are also members of other well-established societies, such as the Royal Society of British Artists, the Royal Institute of Painters in Water Colours, The Pastel Society, and the Society of Equestrian Artists.

The SWA collated a four-volume dictionary of the society's exhibitors to 1996. The society's archive was given to the Victoria & Albert Museum's Archive of Art and Design in 1996. Only the RA and the Royal Scottish Academy produce such records.

Membership 

Membership of the SWA is composed of a maximum of 150 members. They promote new artists and encourage non-members to show their work at their annual exhibition.

The first step towards becoming a member is to submit six works regularly (although a maximum of four will be hung) for the Annual Open Exhibition. These are considered by a selection committee, and if judged exceptional, the artist is elected to become an associate member (ASWA), subject to space within the society. Associate members become eligible for election to full membership in the following year.

Presidents 

 1886–1912	Madeline Marrable
 1913–1915	Mary Pownall
 1916		Probably Beth Amoore
 1917–1922	Lota Bowen
 1923–1931	Charlotte Blakeney Ward
 1932–1967	Dame Laura Knight
 1968–1976	Lady Muriel Wheeler
 1977–1982	Alice Rebecca Kendall
 1982–1985	Gladys Dawson
 1985–2000	Barbara Tate
 2000–2005	Elizabeth R. Meek, MBE, HPRMS, FRSA
 2005–2012	Barbara Penketh Simpson
 2012–2017	Sue Jelley
 2017–2020	Soraya French
 2020–2020	Dr Linda Smith
 2021–	Helen Sinclair

Acting presidents 

 1932–1933	Dorothea Sharp
 1934–1936	Helen Stuart Weir
 1937–1939	Constance Bradshaw
 1940   Ethel Léontine Gabain
 1947–1948	Dorothea Medley Selous (aka. Jamieson)
 1949–1950	Irene Ryland
 1951–1967	Lady Muriel Wheeler
 1973–1976	Alice R. Kendall

Notable members 
(In alphabetical order, excluding SWA presidents or acting presidents, listed above)

 Margaret Backhouse 
 Rose Maynard Barton 
 Jose Christopherson
 Florence Claxton 
 Edith Collier 
 Lillian Cotton 
 Helga von Cramm 
 Ursula Fookes 
 Frances C. Fairman
 Laura Sylvia Gosse
 Alice Gwendoline Rhona Haszard 
 Cecil Mary Leslie
 Sarah Louisa Kilpack
 Vivien Mallock
 June Mendoza 
 Sara Page 
 Emily Murray Paterson
 Hazel Reeves
 Janet Russell
 Mabel Mary Spanton 
 Elizabeth Southerden Thompson 
 Helen Thornycroft 
 Daphne Todd 
 Flora Twort
 Emily Warren
 Mabel Wickham 
 Caroline Fanny Williams

Officers 
President
 Helen Sinclair

Vice Presidents
 Anne Blankson-Hemans
 Rachel Parker

Directors
 Soraya French
 Dani Humberstone
 Sue Jelley PPSWA SPF
 Rosemary Miller SAA

Honorary Treasurer
 Rachel Parker SWA

Company Secretary
 Rosemary Miller SAA

Executive Secretary
 Rebecca Cotton

Press Officer

Council Members
 Anne Blankson-Hemans
 Sera Knight
 Rachel Parker
 Angela Brittain
 Helen Sinclair
 Dr Linda Smith
 Julie Colins

Honorary Members
 Philomena Davidson PPRBS
 June Mendoza AO OBE RP ROI
 Ruth Pilkington ROI
 Susan Ryder PVPRP NEAC
 Emma Sergeant
 Daphne J. Todd OBE PPRP NEAC FRSA
 Belinda Tong
 Joyce Wyatt HonUA ASAF(HC) FRSA

Honorary Retired Members
 Eva Castle
 Pamela Davis
 Mary Grant
 Pam Henderson
 Patricia Nichols
 Joyce Rogerson
 Dorothy Watts

Activities

Annual exhibition 

The society holds various exhibitions throughout the year, culminating in the annual exhibition at the Mall Galleries in London. The exhibition consists of works by members and non-members, which are selected by a panel from an open call for entries. The exhibition offers awards to selected artists, many of which are supplied by the Society's sponsors, and aims to highlight the wide range and diversity of fine art created by women.

Exhibition venues since the inception of the SFA have always been in London – listed below:

 1857		The Gallery, 315 Oxford Street
 1858 & 1859	Unknown
 1860–1863	53 Pall mall
 1863–1867 	48 Pall Mall
 1868–1896	Initially held at the Architectural Association, Conduit Street, with other venues, probably at Great Marlborough Street, the Haymarket, Pall Mall, and at the Egyptian Hall, Piccadilly. 
 1897–1922 	6a Suffolk Street, with the exception of the years 1912 to 1914 and 1919.
 1923–1940 	Royal Institute Galleries
 1941–1946 	No exhibitions were held during World War II
 1947 		The Guildhall 
 1948–1969	Royal Institute Galleries
 1970		Chenil Galleries 
 1971–1987	The Mall Galleries
 1988–1989	Westminster Gallery
 2000–2003	Westminster Hall
 2004–2020	The Mall Galleries
 2020		The exhibition this year was held online due to COVID-19 restrictions
 2021		The exhibition this year was held online due to COVID-19 restrictions
 2022-		The Mall Galleries

Special reception 

The SWA has a history of collaborating with charities to help with the under-privileged and vulnerable. Currently, the SWA collaborates with Breast Cancer Now, the UK's largest breast cancer charity, created by the merger of Breast Cancer Campaign and Breakthrough Breast Cancer. Each year a special reception is held during the annual exhibition, here members donate works that are auctioned and the proceeds from the sales are presented to the charity.

Demonstrations and workshops 

During the annual exhibition and within the gallery, member artists provide a series of informal demonstrations to the public. Special workshops are also led by members and held within the Learning Centre at the Mall Galleries.

References

Sources 
 Barbara Tate and the Society Of Women Artists, www.barbaratate.co.uk/painting-menu/23-fine-art-stories/150-society-of-women-artists.html retrieved 01-01-2017
 Baile De Laperriere, Charles, The Society of Women Artists exhibitors 1855–1996 : a dictionary of artists and their works in the annual exhibitions of The Society of Women Artists, 4 volumes, Hilmarton Press, Wiltshire, c1996
 Gray, Sara, The Dictionary of British Women Artists, The Lutterworth Press, 2009, www.lutterworth.com/pub/dictionary%20women%20artists%20intro.pdf retrieved 01-01-2017
 Just Opened London, Society of Women Artists retrieved 01-01-2017
 Nunn, Pamela Geraldine, The Mid-Victorian Woman Artist 1850–1879, PhD Thesis, University College London, 1982
 The Society of Women Artists 155th Annual Exhibition 2016 catalogue

External links 
Society of Women Artists

British art
Art societies
British artist groups and collectives
1855 establishments in the United Kingdom
Arts organizations established in 1855
Women's organisations based in the United Kingdom
Women in art